Harrison Kelley (May 12, 1836 – July 24, 1897) was a U.S. Representative from Kansas.

Born William Henry Harrison Kelley in Montgomery Township, Ohio, Kelley attended the common schools. He moved to Coffey County, Kansas, in March 1858. During the Civil War Kelley enlisted in the Fifth Regiment, Kansas Volunteer Cavalry, and served through all grades to captain. He served as captain of Company B, Fifth Cavalry, for over two years. He returned to Burlington, Kansas, in 1865. Brigadier general of Kansas State Militia in 1865. He served as a member of the State house of representatives 1868-1870. He served as director of the State penitentiary 1868-1873. Receiver of the United States land office at Topeka in 1877 and 1878. He served in the State senate 1880-1884. Deputy collector of internal revenue. He served as chairman of the livestock sanitary commission of the State. Treasurer of the State board of charities in 1889.

Kelley was elected as a Republican to the Fifty-first Congress to fill the vacancy caused by the resignation of Thomas Ryan and served from December 2, 1889, to March 3, 1891. He died in Burlington, Kansas on July 24, 1897. He was interred in Bowman Cemetery, Ottumwa, near Burlington, Kansas.

References

1836 births
1897 deaths
Republican Party members of the Kansas House of Representatives
Republican Party Kansas state senators
American militia generals
Republican Party members of the United States House of Representatives from Kansas
19th-century American politicians
People from Wood County, Ohio
People from Burlington, Kansas
Union Army officers